Chirala (چڑالہ)[ ] is a village and Union Council of Dhirkot Tehsil in the Bagh District of Azad Kashmir.

Geography 
Chirala is a hilltop village near the confluence of the Mahl River with the Jhelum River in the Bagh District of Azad Kashmir. Beyond the Mahl River to the south is the Poonch District of Azad Kashmir. To the west of the Jhelum River is the Punjab province of Pakistan.

Other villages around Chirala are Narakot, Makhyal and Sahlian.

History
Prior to 1947, Chirala had a military outpost of the Jammu and Kashmir State Forces. In October 1947, it was held by two Gorkha companies of the 7th Battalion of the State Forces, commanded by Captains Dalbir Singh and Lachman Dass. At the beginning of the October, the post was attacked by the Poonch rebels and subjected to "continuous mortar and medium machine-gun fire".

Reinforcements were sent from Srinagar on 3 October, consisting of two companies of the 8th Battalion under Lt. Col. Maluk Singh . After passing Kohala, the force found that "every ridge, hilltop and track-bend" was held by the rebels offering stiff resistance. The reinforcements eventually reached the post on 7 October and evacuated the Gorkhas and the refugees taking shelter there. En route to Bagh, the forces again faced rebels along the way. After a stiff fight at Arja, they eventually reached Bagh on 13 October. Abdul Haq Suharwardy states that the rebel resistance was organised by Sardar Abdul Qayyum Khan.

Chirala thus came into the rebel hands and became part of Azad Kashmir.

Etymology 
This town is surrounded by the trees of Pine (چیڑ), thus result into her name چیڑ والہ  which means a place with trees of Pine and later it became Chirala (چیڑالہ).

Sub Villages/محلہ جات 
 چڑالہ خاص (Main Chirala): includes Chirala Bazar, Kesaal Khetar
 موہڑہ کاٹھواڑ (Mora, Kathwar): includes Moora & Kathwar, Aaroti, Ghala, Otay Ghal
 گہل پونہ (Ghal, Poona) :  includes Ghal, Poona, Banj Bisooti, Barmyal, Kachal Moreen, Chamba, Doonga Khetar
 سوہاوہ شریف (Sohawa Sharif) : includes Sohawa, Seri Bandi, Konal, Jahala Toopa, Nar
 نمب سیداں (Numb Syedian) : includes  Numb, Kakrya, Handala ker, Hillan
 فتح پور  (Fatheh Poor): includes  Fatehpoor, Khapadder
کرنونہ بزرکوٹ ( Karnoota, Bizerkot) : includes Karnoota, Bagly, Bizerkot

Tribes and Groups

The majority of the inhabitants of UC Chirala are the Abbasi (عباسی،اولادعباس(رض) Other tribes such as the Syed, Awan, Raja Hashmi Qurashi etc.) also inhabit the area in smaller proportion. The main families of 
 عباسی, Abbasi are (پلوا ل ,داتیال , علیا ل, قیوال ).
 Syed are گردیزی،  نقوی  ۔ بخاری  جعفری
 Awan اعوان  ۔  ملک اعوان ۔ قطب شاہی اعوان 
  Raja  تیزیال راجپوت  جنجوعہ راجپوت۔  کھکے راجپوت

Political parties
The main political parties from this area are  Muslim Conference, Jamaat e Islami, Peoples Party, PML (N), JUI, and JKLF.

Attique Ahmed Khan is the Member of the Legislative Assembly of Azad Kashmir (MLA) representing the area in legislative assembly. His opponent was Major(Retired) Latif  Khalique.
Javed Arif Abbasi is the Member of the District Council of District Bagh from Chirala.

Elected Members of Union Council(Local Elections 2022)
 Mora Kathwar:             Abdul Qadoos
 Chirala Khas/Karnoota:    Faraz Abbasi           
 Ghal Poona:               Azad Kiyani
 Numb Syedian:             Syed Ghayour Ali 
 Sohawa Sharif:            Chaudhry Waseem
 Konal/Jahala Topa:        Zahid Abbasi 
 Fateh Poor:               Ishtiaq Abbasi
 Youth Councller:          Mubashir Abbasi Adv
 Lady  Councller:          Munaza Nisar Abbasi

Educational Institutions
 Government Boys Inter College Chirala
 Government Girls Higher Secondary School Chirala
 Iqra Public School and College
 Read Foundation High School 
 Allama Iqbal Science Degree College
 Flying Angles Public School

Others in the town:
 Govt. Boys High School:  Sohawa Sharif, Khapaddr, Doonga Khetar
 Govt. Girls High School:  Sohawa Sharif, Seri Bandi,

Mosques and Religious Institutions
 - مرکزی جامع مسجد  چڑالہ 
 - جامع مسجد عبد الرحماں چڑالہ مرکزی اسلامی
دربار عالیہ مخدومیہ سوہاوہ شر یف 
دربار عالیہ چشتیہ نظامیہ سوہاوہ شریف
دربار عالیہ حضرت سالم خان عباسی چڑالہ
مرکزی امام بارگاہ نمب سیداں

How to Reach
From Rawalpindi Islamabad : 

-Follow the Murree-Kohala road and take left turn from Koahala and then with the help of Basharat Shaheed Road, you can reach Chirala

-Follow the Murree-Kohala road and take right turn from Phagwari to down stream to Jhelum River. Cross the Jhelum river at Khappadar which is part of UC Chirala.

- Follow Lehtrar-Kotli Sattyan Road, cross the river Jhelum at Tain Dhalkot and then follow river Jhelum in opposite direction. You will reach Seri Bandi.

From Muzaffarabad : 

- Follow Kohala Road and use Basharat Shaeed Road from Monhasa to reach Chirala

References

Populated places in Bagh District